HMR International School Bangalore (HMR) is a well known school in Bangalore, India. It is located near Hennur cross of Bangalore near the Hennur Bus Depoy. The school is part of HMR Groups and it follows CBSE syllabus.

References

International schools in Bangalore